El Bajío (the lowland) is a cultural and geographical region within the central Mexican plateau which roughly spans from north-west of the Mexico City metropolitan area to the main silver mines in the northern-central part of the country. This includes (from south to north) the states of Querétaro, Guanajuato, parts of Jalisco (Centro, Los Altos de Jalisco), Aguascalientes and parts of Zacatecas, San Luis Potosí and Michoacán.

Located at the border between Mesoamerica and Aridoamerica, El Bajío saw relatively few permanent settlements and big civilizations during Pre-Columbian history, being mostly inhabited by nomadic tribes known to the Aztecs as "The Chichimeca" peoples (the barbarians), another Nahua group from whom the Toltec and the Aztecs were probably descended. The tribes that inhabited El Bajío proved to be some of the hardest to conquer for the Spanish, but due to its strategic location in the Silver Route, it also drew prominent attention from the Spanish crown and some of the flagship Mexican colonial cities had to be built there, such as Guanajuato and Zacatecas. The abundant mineral wealth and favorable farming conditions would soon turn the region into one of New Spain's richest. At the beginning of the 19th century, El Bajío was also place to the ignition of the Mexican War of Independence, and saw most of its battles during the initial phase of the war, including the Cry of Dolores, the storming of the Alhóndiga de Granaditas and the Battle of Calderón Bridge.

Nowadays, the region features one of the strongest economies in Mexico and Latin America, drawing both domestic investment from the adjacent, industry-heavy State of Mexico, as well as foreign companies in seek for cheap specialized labor and decent infrastructure (mostly American, Japanese and to some extent, European vehicle and electronics companies). The largest cities of the Bajío are Guadalajara, León, Santiago de Querétaro, and Aguascalientes.

History of El Bajío
Recent archaeological studies of the Bajío have discovered an extensive, historic cultural tradition unique to the region, particularly along the flood plains of the Lerma and Laja rivers. The Bajío Culture flourished from 300 to 650 CE, with cultural centers ranging from El Cóporo in the far north of Guanajuato to Plazuelas in the far south west.  More than 1,400 sites have been discovered throughout the state of Guanajuato, with only the sites of Cañada de la Virgen, El Cóporo, Peralta, and Plazuelas having received extensive study. This region was also known as La Gran Chichimeca in later years. It was the epicenter of the historic Chichimeca War in the 16th century, and the cradle of Mexican War of Independence from 1810. The Bajío is where in April 1915, during the Mexican Revolution, General Álvaro Obregón provoked decisive battles against Pancho Villa. Villa's troops lost in June that year outside the city of Celaya, in the state of Guanajuato.

Geography
In general usage, the region is usually associated with the States of Guanajuato and Querétaro, even though those two states form only a part of the Bajío. During the Viceroyalty of New Spain, the area was known as the breadbasket of the territory. As of 2014, the region produces sorghum, wheat and maize as its main crops.

The Bajío region lies in the basin of the Rio Lerma and Río Grande de Santiago.

Culture
The Bajío is known for being the cradle of Mexican Independence from the Spanish Empire, and for being one of the conservative bastions of Mexican Catholicism.

States

Secondary states sometimes considered as partly contributing to El Bajío or enclosing it: Michoacán, Zacatecas, San Luis Potosí and Estado de México (State of Mexico).

Demography

Largest cities

Economy 

Today, the region is one of the fastest-growing in the country. This has caused the metropolitan areas to attract many migrants from other parts of Mexico. The region has had an outstanding industrial and economic development in the last 15 years. The cities of El Bajío have one of the highest income per capita figures in Mexico.

Tourism 
Due to its colonial heritage, the Bajío is home to around eight UNESCO World Heritage Sites (depending on how its limits are defined): 
Downtown Querétaro City.
Franciscan Missions in the Sierra Gorda (shrines in the rural Querétaro Huasteca region, by Junípero Serra, also founder of many Californian missions).
Guanajuato City and adjacent mines.
San Miguel de Allende and Sanctuary of Jesús Nazareno de Atotonilco (town in the state of Guanajuato).
Hospicio Cabañas (colonial hospital complex and art museum in Guadalajara).
Agave Landscape and Ancient Industrial Facilities of Tequila (Jalisco).
Zacatecas City
Camino Real de Tierra Adentro
Downtown Morelia

Industry 
  

The region was preferred by foreign companies for its proximity to the US, second only in foreign manufacturing plants to the Mexico-US border. It also began to be a hub for the national industrial market, because El Bajío naturally sits between the preexisting industrial zones of Mexico's three main cities: Mexico City to the south, Guadalajara to the west and Monterrey to the north. The main investor was Japan, although the United States, South Korea, Germany, France, Italy and Spain also have important presence in the area. It is estimated that, by 2016, Asian foreign direct investment totaled over 1.5 billion dollars. Guanajuato (León-Silao and Celaya) hosts General Motors, Volkswagen, Pirelli, Honda, Toyota, Mazda, Denso, Mitsubishi, and Sumitomo plants. Aguascalientes hosts Nissan, Renault, Mercedes, Yazaki and Jatco plants. Querétaro hosts Mitsubishi, Samsung and Bombardier plants. San Luis Potosí hosts Yazaki. The State of Mexico (Cuautitlán Izcalli) hosts a Ford plant. Bajío Shimbun is a monthly, Japanese-language newspaper founded in June 2015. The first Japanese consulate in Mexico was inaugurated in January 2016 in León and will serve the Bajío region. As of 2017 there were 1143 Japanese, 294 United-Statesians and 200 Spanish legal immigrants in Aguascalientes according to the immigration authorities, although the total number of immigrants is thought to be much higher. In 2015, authorities reported a total of 6230 legally-registered immigrants in the state of Querétaro, most of them from the United States, Spain, Colombia, South Korea, Germany, Cuba, France, Canada, Japan and Venezuela. 

Now archetypal in the development plans of the local governments, these business partnerships with multinational corporations have been criticized for exploiting Mexico's weak labor laws and low wages, lacking long-term potential of benefiting the local population and for outsourcing jobs out of their countries of origin in the developed world.

Gallery

See also
Bajío dry forests
Geography of Mexico

References

Further reading
Brading, D.A. Haciendas and Ranchos in the Mexican Bajío: Léon, 1700-1860. Cambridge: Cambridge University Press 1978.
Murphy, Michael A. Irrigation in the Bajío Region of Colonial Mexico. Boulder: Westview Press 1986.
Ocaranza Sainz, Ignacio. Estudio geográfico y económico del Bajío, Universidad Nacional Autónoma de Mexico, 1963
Sánchez Rodríguez, Martín, "Mexico's Breadbasket: Agriculture and the Environment in the Bajío" in Christopher R. Boyer, A Land Between Waters: Environmental Histories of Modern Mexico. Tucson: University of Arizona Press 2012, pp.50-72.
Wright Carr, David Charles (1999). La conquista del Bajío y los orígenes de San Miguel de Allende, Universidad del Valle de México-Fondo de Cultura Económica, México.

External links

http://www.cuentame.inegi.org.mx/territorio/rev/index.html
http://www.inegi.org.mx/sistemas/mexicocifras/default.aspx?e=11&i=i
http://www.e-local.gob.mx/work/templates/enciclo/guanajuato/hist.htm
http://www.historicas.unam.mx/moderna/ehmc/ehmc14/187.html
https://web.archive.org/web/20101223114649/http://www.bicentenario.gob.mx/bdb/bdbpdf/NBNM/R/23.pdf

Historical regions in Mexico
Geography of Mexico
Geography of Mesoamerica
Pre-Columbian cultural areas
Regions of Mexico